Emily Hobhouse (9 April 1860 – 8 June 1926) was a British welfare campaigner, anti-war activist, and pacifist. She is primarily remembered for bringing to the attention of the British public, and working to change, the deprived conditions inside the British concentration camps in South Africa built to incarcerate Boer and African civilians during the Second Boer War.

Early life
Born in St Ive, near Liskeard in Cornwall, she was the daughter of Caroline (née Trelawny) and Reginald Hobhouse, an Anglican rector and the first Archdeacon of Bodmin. She was the sister of Leonard Trelawny Hobhouse, a peace activist and proponent of social liberalism. She was a second cousin of the peace activist Stephen Henry Hobhouse and was a major influence on him.

Her mother died when she was 20, and she spent the next fourteen years looking after her father who was in poor health. When her father died in 1895 she went to Minnesota to perform welfare work amongst Cornish mineworkers living there, the trip having been organised by the wife of the Archbishop of Canterbury. There she became engaged to John Carr Jackson and the couple bought a ranch in Mexico but this did not prosper and the engagement was broken off. She returned to England in 1898 after losing most of her money in a speculative venture. Her wedding veil (which she never wore) hangs in the head office of the Oranje Vrouevereniging (Orange Women's Society) in Bloemfontein, the first women's welfare organisation in the Orange Free State, as a symbol of her commitment to the uplifting of women.

Second Boer War

When the Second Boer War broke out in South Africa in October 1899, a Liberal MP, Leonard Courtney, invited Hobhouse to become secretary of the women's branch of the South African Conciliation Committee, of which he was president. She wrote It was late in the summer of 1900 that I first learnt of the hundreds of Boer women that became impoverished and were left ragged by our military operations… the poor women who were being driven from pillar to post, needed protection and organized assistance.

She founded the Distress Fund for South African Women and Children, and sailed for the Cape Colony on 7 December 1900 to supervise its distribution, and arrived on 27 December. She wrote later:I came quite naturally, in obedience to the feeling of unity or oneness of womanhood ... it is when the community is shaken to its foundations, that abysmal depths of privation call to each other and that a deeper unity of humanity evinces itself.

When she left England, she only knew about the concentration camp at Port Elizabeth, but on arrival found out about the many other concentration camps (45 in total). She had a letter of introduction to the British High Commissioner, Alfred Milner, from her aunt, the wife of Arthur Hobhouse, himself the son of Henry Hobhouse, Permanent Under-Secretary at the Home Office under Sir Robert Peel, and who knew Milner. From him she obtained the use of two railway trucks, subject to the approval of the army commander, Lord Kitchener, which she received two weeks later, although it only allowed her to travel as far as Bloemfontein and take one truck of supplies for the camps, about 12 tons.

Conditions in the British concentration camps

She had persuaded the authorities to let her visit several British concentration camps and to deliver aid. Her report on conditions at the camps, set out in a report entitled "Report of a Visit to the Camps of Women and Children in the Cape and Orange River Colonies", was delivered to the British government in June 1901. As a result, a formal commission was set up and a team of official investigators headed by Millicent Fawcett was sent to inspect the camps. Overcrowding in bad unhygienic conditions due to neglect and lack of resources were the causes of a mortality rate that in the eighteen months during which the camps were in operation reached a total of 26,370, of which 24,000 were children under sixteen and infants, i.e. the rate at which the children died was some 50 a day. The following extracts from the report by Emily Hobhouse make very clear the extent of culpable neglect by the authorities:

In some camps, two, and even three sets of people, occupy one tent and 10, and even 12, persons are frequently herded together in tents of which the cubic capacity is about 500 c.f.

I call this camp system a wholesale cruelty… To keep these Camps going is murder to the children.

It can never be wiped out of the memories of the people. It presses hardest on the children. They droop in the terrible heat, and with the insufficient unsuitable food; whatever you do, whatever the authorities do, and they are, I believe, doing their best with very limited means, it is all only a miserable patch on a great ill. Thousands, physically unfit, are placed in conditions of life which they have not strength to endure. In front of them is blank ruin… If only the English people would try to exercise a little imagination –picture the whole miserable scene. Entire villages rooted up and dumped in a strange, bare place.

The women are wonderful. They cry very little and never complain. The very magnitude of their sufferings, their indignities, loss and anxiety seems to lift them beyond tears… only when it cuts afresh at them through their children do their feelings flash out.
Some people in town still assert that the Camp is a haven of bliss. I was at the camp to-day, and just in one little corner this is the sort of thing I found – The nurse, underfed and overworked, just sinking on to her bed, hardly able to hold herself up, after coping with some thirty typhoid and other patients, with only the untrained help of two Boer girls–cooking as well as nursing to do herself.
Next tent, a six months' baby gasping its life out on is mother's knee. Two or three others drooping sick in that tent.
Next, a girl of twenty-one lay dying on a stretcher. The father, a big, gentle Boer kneeling beside her; while, next tent, his wife was watching a child of six, also dying, and one of about five drooping. Already this couple had lost three children in the hospital and so would not let these go, though I begged hard to take them out of the hot tent. I can't describe what it is to see these children lying about in a state of collapse. It’s just exactly like faded flowers thrown away. And one has to stand and look on at such misery, and be able to do almost nothing.

It was a splendid child and it dwindled to skin and bone ... The baby had got so weak it was past recovery. We tried what we could but today it died. It was only 3 months but such a sweet little thing… It was still alive this morning; when I called in the afternoon they beckoned me in to see the tiny thing laid out, with a white flower in its wee hand. To me it seemed a "murdered innocent". And an hour or two after another child died.

Another child had died in the night, and I found all three little corpses being photographed for the absent fathers to see some day. Two little wee white coffins at the gate waiting, and a third wanted. I was glad to see them, for at Springfontein, a young woman had to be buried in a sack, and it hurt their feelings woefully.

It is such a curious position, hollow and rotten to the heart’s core, to have made all over the State large uncomfortable communities of people whom you call refugees and say you are protecting, but who call themselves prisoners of war, compulsorily detained, and detesting your protection. They are tired of being told by officers that they are refugees under "the kind and beneficient protection of the British". In most cases there is no pretence that there was treachery, or ammunition concealed, or food given or anything. It was just that an order was given to empty the country. Though the camps are called refugee, there are in reality a very few of these–perhaps only half-a-dozen in some camps. It is easy to tell them, because they are put in the best marquees, and have had time given to them to bring furniture and clothes, and are mostly self-satisfied and vastly superior people. Very few, if any of them, are in want.

Those who are suffering most keenly, and who have lost most, either of their children by death or their possessions by fire and sword, such as those reconcentrated women in the camps, have the most conspicuous patience, and never express a wish that their men should be the ones to give way. It must be fought out now, they think, to the bitter end. It is a very costly business upon which England has embarked, and even at such a cost hardly the barest necessities can be provided, and no comforts. It is so strange to think that every tent contains a family, and every family is in trouble–loss behind, poverty in front, sickness, privation and death in the present. But they are very good, and say they have agreed to be cheerful and make the best of it all. The Mafeking camp folk were very surprised to hear that English women cared a rap about them or their suffering. It has done them a lot of good to hear that real sympathy is felt for them at home, and so I am glad I fought my way here, if only for that reason.

The tents
Imagine the heat outside the tents and the suffocation inside! ...the sun blazed through the single canvas, and the flies lay thick and black on everything; no chair, no table, nor any room for such; only a deal box, standing on its end, served as a wee pantry.
In this tent live Mrs B's five children (three quite grown up) and a little Kaffir servant girl. Many tents have more occupants. Mrs M. ..has six children in camp, all ill, two in the tin hospital with typhoid, and four sick in the tent. A terrible evil just now is the dew. It is so heavy, and comes through the single canvas of the tents, wetting everything… All the morning the gangways are filled with the blankets and odds and ends, regularly turned out to dry in the sun. The doctor told me today he highly disapproved of tents for young children, and expected a high mortality before June.

Hygiene
Soap has been unattainable and none given in the rations. With much persuasion, and weeks after requisitioning, soap is now given occasionally in very minute quantities–certainly not enough for clothes and personal washing.
We have much typhoid and are dreading an outbreak, so I am directing my energies to getting the water of the Modder River boiled. As well swallow typhoid germs whole as drink that water–so say doctors.
Yet they cannot boil it all, for – first, fuel is very scarce; that which is supplied weekly would not cook a meal a day…and they have to search the already bare kopjes for a supply. There is hardly a bit to be had. Second, they have no extra utensil to hold the water when boiled. I propose, therefore, to give each tent a pail or crock, and get a proclamation issued that all drinking water must be boiled.

The "cruel system"
Above all one would hope that the good sense, if not the mercy, of the English people, will cry out against the further development of this cruel system which falls with crushing effect upon the old, the weak, and the children. May they stay the order to bring in more and yet more. Since Old Testament days was ever a whole nation carried captive?

Late in 1901 the camps ceased to receive new families and conditions improved in some camps; but the damage was done. Historian Thomas Pakenham writes of Kitchener's policy turn:
No doubt the continued 'hullabaloo' at the death-rate in these concentration camps, and Milner's belated agreement to take over their administration, helped changed K's mind [some time at the end of 1901]. By mid-December at any rate, Kitchener was already circulating all column commanders with instructions not to bring in women and children when they cleared the country, but to leave them with the guerrillas... Viewed as a gesture to Liberals, on the eve of the new session of Parliament at Westminster, it was a shrewd political move. It also made excellent military sense, as it greatly handicapped the guerrillas, now that the drives were in full swing... It was effective precisely because, contrary to the Liberals' convictions, it was less humane than bringing them into camps, though this was of no great concern to Kitchener.

Charles Aked, a Baptist minister in Liverpool, said on 22 December 1901, Peace Sunday: "Great Britain cannot win the battles without resorting to the last despicable cowardice of the most loathsome cur on earth—the act of striking a brave man's heart through his wife's honour and his child's life. The cowardly war has been conducted by methods of barbarism... the concentration camps have been Murder Camps." Afterwards, a crowd followed him home and broke the windows of his house.

Bloemfontein Concentration Camp
Hobhouse arrived at the camp at Bloemfontein on 24 January 1901 and was shocked by the conditions she encountered:
They went to sleep without any provision having been made for them and without anything to eat or to drink. I saw crowds of them along railway lines in bitterly cold weather, in pouring rain–hungry, sick, dying and dead. Soap was not dispensed. The water supply was inadequate. No bedstead or mattress was procurable. Fuel was scarce and had to be collected from the green bushes on the opes of the kopjes (small hills) by the people themselves. The rations were extremely meagre and when, as I frequently experienced, the actual quantity dispensed fell short of the amount prescribed, it simply meant famine.

What most distressed Hobhouse was the sufferings of the undernourished children. Diseases such as measles, bronchitis, pneumonia, dysentery and typhoid had invaded the camp with fatal results. The very few tents were not enough to house the one or more sick persons, most of them children. In the collection Stemme uit die Verlede (Voices from the Past), she recalled the plight of Lizzie van Zyl (1894–1901), the daughter of a Boer combatant who refused to surrender. The girl died at the Bloemfontein camp. According to Hobhouse, the girl was treated harshly and placed on the lowest rations. After a month, she was moved to the new hospital about 50 kilometres away from the concentration camp, suffering from starvation. Unable to speak English, she was labelled an "idiot" by the hospital staff, who were unable to understand her. One day she started calling for her mother. An Afrikaner woman, Mrs Botha, went over to comfort her and to tell her she would see her mother again, but "was brusquely interrupted by one of the nurses who told her not to interfere with the child as she was a nuisance".

When Hobhouse requested soap for the people, she was told that soap was a luxury. She nevertheless succeeded, after a struggle, to have it listed as a necessity, together with straw, more tents and more kettles in which to boil the drinking water. She distributed clothes and supplied pregnant women, who had to sleep on the ground, with mattresses, but she could not forgive what she called
Crass male ignorance, helplessness and muddling… I rub as much salt into the sore places in their minds… because it is good for them; but I can't help melting a little when they are very humble and confess that the whole thing is a grievous and gigantic blunder and presents almost insoluble problems, and they don't know how to face it.

Hobhouse also visited camps at Norvalspont, Aliwal North, Springfontein, Kimberley and Orange River.

Fawcett Commission
When Hobhouse returned to England she received scathing criticism and hostility from the British government and many of the media, but eventually succeeded in obtaining more funding to help the Boer civilians.  The British Liberal leader at the time, Sir Henry Campbell-Bannerman, denounced what he called the "methods of barbarism". The British government eventually agreed to set up the Fawcett Commission to investigate her claims, under Millicent Fawcett, which corroborated her account of the shocking conditions. Hobhouse returned to Cape Town in October 1901, was not permitted to land and was eventually deported five days after arriving, no reason being given. She felt she never received justice for her work. Early the next year Hobhouse went to Lake Annecy in the French Alps where she wrote the book The Brunt of the War and Where it Fell on what she had seen during the war in South Africa.

Rehabilitation and reconciliation
After the war Hobhouse returned to South Africa where she saw that her mission was to assist in healing the wounds inflicted by the war and to support efforts aimed at rehabilitation and reconciliation. With the help of Margaret Clark she decided to set up a home industries scheme with the first being in Philippolis and to teach young women spinning and weaving and lace making so they would have an occupation in their lonely homes.  Ill health, from which she never recovered, forced her to return to England in 1908. She travelled to South Africa again in 1913 for the inauguration of the National Women's Monument in Bloemfontein but had to stop at Beaufort West due to her failing health. Her speech which called for reconciliation and goodwill between all races was read for her and received great acclaim. It was during her time there that she met Mahatma Gandhi.

Later life
Hobhouse was an avid opponent of the First World War and protested vigorously against it. She organised the writing, signing and publishing in January 1915 of the "Open Christmas Letter", addressed "To the Women of Germany and Austria". Through her offices, thousands of women and children were fed daily for more than a year in central Europe after this war. South Africa contributed liberally towards this effort, and an amount of more than £17,000 (nearly £500,000 today) was collected by Mrs. President Steyn (who was to remain a lifelong friend) and sent to Hobhouse for this purpose.

South African honorary citizenship
She became an honorary citizen of South Africa for her humanitarian work there. Unbeknown to her, on the initiative of Mrs R. I. Steyn, a sum of £2,300 was collected from the Afrikaner nation and with that Emily purchased a house in St Ives, Cornwall, which now forms part of Porthminster Hotel. In this hotel a commemorative plaque, situated within what was her lounge, was unveiled by the South African High Commissioner, Mr Kent Durr, as a tribute to her humanitarianism and heroism during the Anglo Boer War

Death
Hobhouse died in Kensington in 1926. Her ashes were ensconced in a niche in the National Women's Monument at Bloemfontein, where she was regarded as a heroine. Her death went unreported in the Cornish press.

Legacy
The southernmost town in Eastern Free State is named Hobhouse after her.

The SAS Emily Hobhouse, one of the South African Navy's three Daphné class submarines, was named after her in 1969. In 1994, after the end of minority rule, the submarine was renamed the SAS Umkhonto.

In Bloemfontein, South Africa, the oldest residence on the campus of the University of the Free State is named after Hobhouse.

There is a statue of Hobhouse at the parish church at St Ive, Cornwall, where she was born.

In 1990 Dirk de Villiers directed the South African film That Englishwoman: An Account of the Life of Emily Hobhouse with Veronica Lang as Emily.

The 2021 film The King's Man features a character named Emily Oxford, who bears a strong resemblance to Hobhouse. She is depicted as an activist criticizing the conditions of Britain's concentration camps in South Africa during the Second Boer War.

See also

 List of peace activists

Further reading
 Emily Hobhouse: Beloved Traitor by Elsabé Brits

References

Sources
 Hobhouse, Emily, The Brunt of War and Where it Fell, London: Methuen, 1902
 Hobhouse, Emily. The Boer War Letters, ed. by Rykie van Reenlisteden. Cape Town and Pretoria 1984.
 Lee, Emanuel. To the Bitter End (New York: Viking, 1985)
 Pakenham, Thomas. The Boer War (Harper Perennial, Reprint edition, 1 December 1992)
 Hall, John. That Bloody Woman: The Turbulent Life of Emily Hobhouse (Truro, Cornwall; Truran Publishers, May 2008) . Note: This title has a Cornish perspective on Emily Hobhouse.
 Jennifer Hobhouse Balme. "To Love One's Enemies: The Work and Life of Emily Hobhouse" (Cobble Hill, B.C., Canada: The Hobhouse Trust, 1994, 1st edition) 
 Jennifer Hobhouse Balme. "To Love One's Enemies: The Work and Life of Emily Hobhouse" (Stuttgart: Ibidem, 2012, 2nd edition) 
 Jennifer Hobhouse Balme. "Agent of Peace: Emily Hobhouse and her Courageous Attempt to End the First World War" (Stroud: History Press, 2015) 
 Jennifer Hobhouse Balme. "Living the Love: Emily Hobhouse post-war (1918–1926)" (Victoria, B.C., Canada: Friesen Press, 2016) 
 Seibold, Birgit Susanne. Emily Hobhouse and the Reports on the Concentration Camps during the Boer War 1899–1902 (Stuttgart: Ibidem, 2011) 
 Birgit Susanne Seibold: Emily Hobhouse und die Berichte über die Konzentrationslager während des Burenkriegs : zwei unterschiedliche Perspektiven, Tübingen, Univ., Diss., 2011,

External links

 
 Article about Emily Hobhouse's role on an Anglo-Boer War Memorial site
 Speech given by President Thabo Mbeki in 2004 quoting Emily Hobhouse
 Biography of Hobhouse on "Special South Africans" site 
 
 

1860 births
1926 deaths
19th-century British women artists
20th-century British women artists
British anti-war activists
British anti–World War I activists
British feminists
British humanitarians
British pacifists
British people of Cornish descent
British suffragists
British women in World War I
Cornish philanthropists
Edwardian era
Emily
Non-interventionism
People from St Ive
People of the Second Boer War
Second Boer War concentration camps
South African feminists
South African humanitarians
South African pacifists
South African suffragists
South African women artists
Women in war 1900–1945